Caledonia Junction is a community in the Canadian province of Nova Scotia, located in Municipality of the District of Lunenburg.

References
  Caledonia Junction on Destination Nova Scotia

Communities in Lunenburg County, Nova Scotia
General Service Areas in Nova Scotia